is a railway station on the Hokuriku Railroad Asanogawa Line in the city Kanazawa, Ishikawa Prefecture, Japan, operated by the private railway operator Hokuriku Railroad (Hokutetsu).

Lines

Station layout
The station consists of one side platform serving a single bi-directional track. The station is unattended.

Adjacent stations

History
Kagatsume Station opened on 10 May 1925.

Surrounding area
 Asano River

See also
 List of railway stations in Japan

External links

  

Railway stations in Ishikawa Prefecture
Railway stations in Japan opened in 1925
Hokuriku Railroad Asanogawa Line